Chris & Moira were a Maltese duo, formed by Moira Stafrace and Christopher Scicluna. They were best known for representing Malta in the 1994 Eurovision Song Contest.

Life and career
Stafrace was born in Malta in 1970. At the age of 12 she started her singing career. She bought a guitar and she started to sing with many bands. She took part in numerous festivals where she won many awards. In 1992 she was given the award for Best Personality in the music industry of her country. In 1993 she met and fell in love with a guitarist, Chris Scicluna.

Scicluna was born in Malta in 1959 and started music studies at the age of 8 and spent most of the 1980s freelancing in the United Kingdom. He recorded his first album in 1979, 'Starlights' as a singer composer with a band. In 1990 'Ever Changing Moods' was released by a band called Getting Closer. One of the songs from Getting Closer's second album 'This Time'  was chosen to represent Malta in the 1993 Eurovision with William Mangion. In this event Chris met Moira and in 1994 composed the music for the song More than Love, which represented their country at the contest in Dublin. They ranked 5th with 97 points - one of the best results for Malta.

In 1999, the duo returned to Eurovision, this time writing a song entitled Believe 'n Peace for the girlband Times Three. The leading singer of the group was Moira's sister. Both Chris and Moira were on stage as backing vocalists.

Scicluna died in February 2022, at the age of 62.

References

External links
Eurovision Song Contest Today Unofficial Site
The official site of the Eurovision Song Contest

See also
Malta in the Eurovision Song Contest

1994 establishments in Malta
2022 disestablishments in Malta
Eurovision Song Contest entrants for Malta
Eurovision Song Contest entrants of 1994
Musical groups established in 1994
Musical groups disestablished in 2022